Liu Yuanfang (born February 1931) is a Chinese nuclear chemist. He is a chemist at the Chinese Academy of Sciences (CAS), who is now Professor of Chemistry at Shanghai University. He has studied nuclear chemistry and radiochemistry for forty years and pioneered education in that field in China.

References 

1931 births
Living people
Chemists from Zhejiang
Educators from Ningbo
Members of the Chinese Academy of Sciences
Nuclear chemists
Academic staff of Peking University
Scientists from Ningbo
Academic staff of Shanghai University
University of Shanghai alumni
Yenching University alumni